Battle of Cancha Rayada may refer to: 

 First Battle of Cancha Rayada (1814), also known as the Disaster of Cancha Rayada, a Patriot defeat during the Patria Vieja Campaign
 Second Battle of Cancha Rayada (1818), also known as the Surprise of Cancha Rayada, a Patriot defeat during the Patria Nueva Campaign